= The Jimmy Fallon Show =

The Jimmy Fallon Show may refer to:

- Late Night with Jimmy Fallon, aired 2009–2014
- The Tonight Show Starring Jimmy Fallon, aired 2014–present
